Wanted is a single-volume Japanese shōjo manga written and illustrated by Matsuri Hino, author of Vampire Knight. The three-chapter work was published by Hakusensha on January 5, 2005. Viz Media released an English language edition in North America on September 2, 2008. It is licensed for regional language releases in Italy by J POP, in Germany by Carlsen Verlag and in Singapore by Chuang Yi.

Plot
Armelia is an orphan girl who is part of a music group who sings for work. One day, while the group was at Governor-General Lanceman's mansion, she meets Luce Lanceman, the Governor-General's nephew, who lost his parents when he was young and would inherit the Governor-General's position after he passes away. Armeria fell in love with Luce, but unfortunately, he was kidnapped by the notorious pirate, Skulls, while he was showing her the armeria flower for which she was named. Seeing Skulls' 'God of Death' tattoo on his chest, Armeria swears to herself that one day she'll rescue Luce from the hands of the pirates. Eight years later, she disguises herself as a boy and joins Skulls' crew to search for Luce, but the truth of what happened to her childhood love is not what she thought it was.

While singing to herself, Armeria is shot by a crew member who mistakenly believes that she is a mermaid come to sink the ship. Skulls rescues her, but as the crew are examining her wound, they discover her to be a woman. Her true gender exposed, she reveals that she has come to find Luce, only to be told by Skulls that Luce is dead, having killed himself long ago. She refuses to believe him, and vows to keep searching. That night, the pirates attack a treasure ship, and Armeria is disgusted by the blood and murder involved in the pirate trade. Although Skulls points out that the treasures were being sent to the king to finance war, Armeria insists that he cannot justify his actions, as they are for his own ends.

At a nearby port, however, she is surprised to see the townspeople welcome the pirates. While singing at a brothel, she discovers that Skulls rebuilt the town, does not rob the poor, and helps towns pillaged by pirates and peasants suffering under unjust landowners. When she confronts Skulls about this, he tells her that the stories are fake, and that she will not find Luce in the town. At that moment, the ship is attacked by the Marquis of Glenger, who has come seeking revenge for his ship being ravaged. When Skulls attempts to fight, the Marquis uses Armeria as a human shield, and despite her belief that Scars will not care if she is taken hostage, he offers his life in exchange for her safety. Armeria breaks free and Skulls calls her by her true name when he protects her from the Marquis' blade. While hiding in a storage room, Armeria realizes that Skulls IS Luce, as she never told anyone her real name. When she questions Doc, the ship's doctor, he reveals that Luce, having regretted being unable to help the peasants his uncle stole from, decided to become a pirate who would help the weak, eventually taking the name "Skulls" away from Doc. Despite her shock at Luce having become such an awful person, Armeria decides to stay with him and become a member of the crew.

After an attack by the navy, Luce decides that they need to find out if the navy are patrolling the area they are currently in. Armeria offers to find out in the next town, reasoning that as she is not a pirate, the townspeople will tell her, but Luce refuses. Angered by this, Armeria takes a boat and rows to the port, where she gets a job in a brothel patronized by Naval officers. She is accosted by a drunk, and saved by another officer, who turns out to be Luce in disguise. He takes her upstairs and demands to know how she planned to find the information they need. When she refuses to answer, telling him not to interfere, he threatens to "buy" her every night until she gives up. Furious with him, she storms out of the room, only to witness an argument between a navy officer and a member of the pirates about Skulls. When another officer suggests that Scars is in town, she yells out that he isn't, drawing the attention of a naval commander.

Armeria is imprisoned by the Navy. While she manages to escape her cell by faking a fainting fit and locking her jailer in, she runs into the commander and his men. Upon being seized and questioned, she claims that Skulls is far out at sea, only for him to come crashing through the window, having been informed of her capture. His crew, having disguised themselves as naval officers, keep the commander at bay while Luce and Armeria escape onto the pirate ship by swinging out of the window. The navy is unable to follow them as the pirates have destroyed the rudders of their ships. During a celebration that night, Armeria learns that Luce sold his treasured golden goddess statue for money to buy her at the brothel, and she realizes that he cares for her more than he is willing to let on.

Some time later, Armeria learns that Luce possesses a map leading to the legendary "Devil's Score", a piece of music so beautiful that it is said to truly be the music of Heaven. However, it is also said to be cursed, as when the composer performed it for a noble, the noble's entire family died of a mysterious illness and the paper wouldn't set alight when he tried to burn it, so it was hidden away on an island. Armeria tries to convince Luce to find the score so that she may sing it but he refuses, only changing his mind when she points out that he would be able to sell it for a lot of money.

On the island, Armeria and Luce search for the score in a cave, only to run into the same commander who captured Armeria previously. He has been sent to the island to find the score for an aristocrat, and uses Armeria as a hostage to get Luce to accompany him to where the treasure is. He wants Luce to fetch the treasure for him, as the chest is booby-trapped, but a cannon is fired above ground, causing the roof to cave in. A falling rock triggers a booby trap of poisoned arrows, and Luce is struck protecting Armeria. It is revealed that the commander is Luce's childhood friend, Reid. The boys were orphaned by pirates at a young age and vowed to avenge them, and Reid is disgusted to learn that Luce has become the pirate Skulls, claiming that Luce is pretending to be Robin Hood while committing crimes.

Luce collapses from the poison, and asks Armeria to sing the Devil's Score. The sound of her voice helps the crew find them. They take Luce back to the ship to be cured, and Reid lets Armeria take the Devil's Score.

Main characters
Armeria
The main character. A girl who met Luce as a child.  Then, several years later, she follows his trail to a pirate named Skulls and his pirate ship, disguising herself as a boy and using the name Alto. Her true gender is discovered when she is shot in the shoulder. On Skulls' ship she has some strange adventures but she discovers a secret about Skulls that makes her understand more about her first love, Luce. Although Armeria/Alto is disgusted by the pirate trade, she wants to be useful to Luce/Skulls and be close to him ("by his side"), at all times.

Luce
The Governor-General's nephew. The man Armeria loves. His parents were killed by pirates. She believes he was taken by the pirate Skullss and she goes to get him back.

Skulls
He is the true Luce and even gives himself away to Armeria by accident when he calls her by her true name. Captain of his own pirate ship. He is actually the second Captain Skulls, and loves Armeria/Alto very much, doing anything to keep her safe. He is confused on how to treat her after all of this time and how much they have both changed, but his heart is in the right place. After being raised by pirates, Luce/Skulls becomes a completely different person and despises his former identity, but sometimes accidentally acts like his old self again, only around Alto though. He regretted being unable to help the peasants his uncle stole from and decided to become a pirate who would help the weak, taking the name "Skulls" from Doc.

Reid
Commander in the navy. He was the childhood friend with Luce. His parents were also killed by pirates.

Doc
The first Captain Skulls, who kidnapped Luce eight years before the story takes place. He now serves as the ship's doctor and adviser.

References

External links
 Official Viz Wanted website
 
 Comic Book Bin review

2005 manga
Hakusensha manga
Madman Entertainment manga
Shōjo manga
Viz Media manga